"I Can't Say Goodbye" is the fourth single from Love Moves, the 1990 album by Kim Wilde.

The single was released exclusively in the UK (the third UK single from the album). The ballad, which featured backing vocals by Jaki Graham, was remixed and edited for the 7" and CD formats, whereas the original album version appears on the 12". The B-side was a megamix of some of Wilde's songs entitled "Sanjazz Megamix", an edit of which was used for the 7".

Chart performance

References

Kim Wilde songs
1990 songs
Songs written by Ricky Wilde
Songs written by Kim Wilde